Clusia cupulata is a species of flowering plant in the family Clusiaceae. It is found only in Panama. It is threatened by habitat loss.

References

cupulata
Flora of Panama
Vulnerable plants
Taxonomy articles created by Polbot
Plants described in 1978